Cassandra Rae Bailey (born 25 February 1978) is a former Australian rugby union player. She was named in Australia's squad for a two-test series against New Zealand in the 2007 Laurie O'Reilly Cup. She made her test debut off the bench in the first match and made her last appearance for the Wallaroos in the second game in Porirua.

References 

1978 births
Living people
Australian female rugby union players
Australia women's international rugby union players